NDP may stand for:

Computing
 Neighbor Discovery Protocol, an Internet protocol
 Nortel Discovery Protocol, a layer two Internet protocol, also called SONMP
 Nondeterministic programming, a type of computer language

Government
 National Development Plan, in Ireland
 National Development Policy, in Malaysia
 Norwegian Petroleum Directorate, agency responsible for the regulation of Norwegian oil resources

Political parties
 Nagaland Democratic Party, India (1999–2004)
 National Defence Party (disambiguation), several parties
 National Democratic and Labour Party, United Kingdom (1918–1923)
 National Democratic Party (disambiguation), several parties
 Nebraska Democratic Party, U.S.
 New Democratic Party (disambiguation), several parties
 Newfoundland Democratic Party (1959)
 Nuclear Disarmament Party, Australia (1984–2009)

Other disambiguations
 National Democratic Movement (disambiguation)
 National Democrats (disambiguation)
 Democratic National Party (disambiguation)

Other
 National Day of Prayer, an annual US observance on the first Thursday of May
 NDP (gene), Norrie disease protein
 Neodymium phosphide, a compound with the chemical formula NdP
 Net domestic product, an economic quantity
 New Douglas Park, a football stadium which is the home of Scottish Premiership side Hamilton Academical F.C.
 Northumberland Development Project, a proposed football stadium and commercial development in Tottenham, London
 Northern Dutchess Paramedics, an advanced life support ambulance service in the Hudson Valley of New York
 Notre Dame de Paris
 Singapore National Day Parade
 Neutron depth profiling, an analytical technique for measuring isotopic mass in near surface of samples